Abdelrahman Ali Mahmoud Kashkal (born 25 August 1987) is an Egyptian male badminton player.

Achievements

All African  Games 
Men's doubles

Mixed doubles

African Championships
Men's singles

Men's doubles

BWF International Challenge/Series (5 titles, 8 runners-up)
Men's doubles

Mixed doubles

 BWF International Challenge tournament
 BWF International Series tournament
 BWF Future Series tournament

References

External links
 

Living people
1987 births
Egyptian male badminton players
Competitors at the 2007 All-Africa Games
Competitors at the 2011 All-Africa Games
Competitors at the 2015 African Games
African Games silver medalists for Egypt
African Games bronze medalists for Egypt
African Games medalists in badminton
Competitors at the 2013 Mediterranean Games
Mediterranean Games competitors for Egypt
21st-century Egyptian people